Criminal Manne is an American rapper. He is a member of The Project Playaz. His Street Ways album reached number 97 on the Billboard R&B Albums Chart.

Career
He started his career during the underground rap scene with producer-DJ Squeeky/Mo Cheda Records, selling more than 200,000 mixtapes out of the trunk of his car and in various radio shops in Memphis, Tennessee in the 1990s with a total of over a million songs sold to date. They began getting recognition from their hit song titled "Buck & Naked" and later signing a deal with Relativity Records (after turning down Universal Records) back in 1998.

Criminal Manne was a part of the group Project Playaz and ultimately got their worldwide recognition and their first music video aired on "Rap City" (now 106 & Park) that premiered in 1998 titled "Buck With Me". Shortly after departing from Relativity Records in 2000, Project Playaz (Criminal Manne, Thugsta & Yo Lynch) signed a short deal with Warlock Records and later ventured to Rap-A-Lot Records in 2001 and dropped their album titled "The Return". Since the departure of Rap-A-Lot Records that occurred in 2002, Criminal Manne ventured into the Independent Music World and has built his own brand without the help of a major label.

Criminal Manne has released four albums and a series of mixtapes. Albums: "PlayTime's Over" in 2002. "Neighborhood Dope Manne" in 2003. "Street Ways" in 2005 and "Got Work" in 2009. Mixtapes: "daNeighborhood Dopeman" (hosted by the Aphilliates & DJ Drama), "The Takeover (with Frayser Boy)", "Atlanta to Memphis" (Criminal Manne & Pastor Troy), "Certified Dopeboy (hosted by DJ Scream)", "Got Work", "The Re-Up (hosted by DJ Scream)", "Certified Dopeboy Vol. 5", "Blow (hosted by DJ 5150)", "Blow 2 (hosted by DJ 5150)", "Blow 3 (hosted by DJ Scream & DJ 5150)", "Blow 3.5 Grams(hosted by Traps N Trunks & DJ Mic Tee)" and "The Come Up (hosted by Traps N Trunks)".

Discography

Independent Mixtapes
 2002: Play Time's Over
 2003: Neighborhood Dope Manne
 2005: Street Ways
 2009: Got Work
 2015 : Trap Talk 
2013: Black Boston George 
 2015: Return of the  Neighborhood Dopeman 
2017 : King Kong 
2018 : Underground King 
2019 : King Kong 2 
 2021: Big Dawg
 2022 : Return of the Neighborhood Dopeman  2

Collaborations
 2006: Atlanta 2 Memphis (with Pastor Troy)

Compilations
 1993: It's the Criminal Manne  (Cassette only)
 1994: Solo Tape (Cassette only)
 1995: Greatest Hitz (Cassette only)
 1996: Da Compilation (Cassette only)

Mixtapes
 2007: Da Supplyer Mixtape
 2007: Da Neighborhood Dopeman 
 2008: The Takeover (with Frayser Boy)
 2009: Certified Dopeboy  (hosted by DJ Scream)
 2010: Certified Dopeboy 2: The Re-Up (hosted by DJ Scream)
 2010: Certified Dopeboy Vol. 3: Supply & Demand (hosted by DJ 007)
 2010: Certified Dopeboy Vol. 4 2010: Certified Dopeboy Vol. 5: The Cook Up 2011: Blow   (hosted by Dj Scream & DJ 5150)
 2011: Blow 2 
 2012: Blow 3 
 2013: Blow 3.5 Grams(hosted by Traps N Trunks & DJ Mic Tee)
 2013: The Come Up   
 2014: Arm & Hammer   
 2014: Kings of the Trap'' (with OJ Da Juiceman) (hosted by DJ Scream

References

African-American crunk musicians
African-American male rappers
American male rappers
Gangsta rappers
Living people
Rappers from Memphis, Tennessee
Underground rappers
21st-century American rappers
21st-century American male musicians
Year of birth missing (living people)
21st-century African-American musicians